Yigael Yadin (20 March 1917 – 28 June 1984) was an Israeli archeologist, soldier and politician. He was the second Chief of Staff of the Israel Defense Forces and Deputy Prime Minister from 1977 to 1981.

Biography

Yigael Sukenik (later Yadin) was born in Ottoman Palestine to archaeologist Eleazar Sukenik and his wife Hasya Sukenik-Feinsold, a teacher and women's rights activist.

Military career
 
He joined the Haganah at age 15, and served  in a variety of different capacities. In 1946,  he left the Haganah following an argument with its commander Yitzhak Sadeh over the inclusion of a machine gun as part of standard squad equipment.

In 1948, shortly before the State of Israel declared its independence, Yadin, interrupted his university studies to return to active service. He served as Israel's Head of Operations during the 1948 Arab-Israeli War, and was responsible for many of the key decisions made during the course of that war. In April, probably under the authorization of Ben-Gurion, he oversaw the secret biological warfare operation, Cast Bread, in a campaign designed to poison the wells of Palestinian villages with bacteria, and prevent the return of the evicted. In June 1948 he threatened to resign during the Generals' Revolt during which he accused Ben-Gurion of attempting "to transform the army as a whole into an army of one political party (Mapai)".

Yadin was appointed Chief of Staff of the IDF on 9 November 1949, following the resignation of Yaakov Dori, and served in that capacity for three years. He resigned on 7 December 1952, over disagreements with then prime minister and defense minister David Ben-Gurion about cuts to the military budget, which he argued should be at least one third of the national budget. By age thirty-five, he had completed his military career.

Archaeology career
Upon leaving the military, he devoted himself to research and began his life's work in archaeology. In 1956 he received the Israel Prize in Jewish studies, for his doctoral thesis on the translation of the Dead Sea Scrolls. As an archeologist, he excavated some of the most important sites in the region, including the Qumran Caves, Masada, Hazor, Tel Megiddo and caves in Judean Desert where artifacts from Bar Kokhba revolt were found. In 1960 he initiated scholarly archeological exploration of caves south of Ein Gedi, an enterprise approved by Ben-Gurion in which Israel Defense Forces rendered considerable support. He wrote about the expedition and its findings in his 1971 book Bar-Kokhba: The Rediscovery of the Legendary Hero of the Second Jewish Revolt against Rome. Yadin considered the Solomonic Gate at Tel Gezer to be the highpoint of his career. He was sometimes forced to deal with the theft of important artifacts, occasionally by prominent political and military figures. In one instance, where the thefts were commonly attributed to the famous one-eyed general Moshe Dayan, he remarked: "I know who did it, and I am not going to say who it is, but if I catch him, I'll poke out his other eye, too."

Even as an archaeologist, Yadin never completely abandoned public life. On the eve of the Six-Day War, he served as a military adviser to prime minister Levi Eshkol, and following the Yom Kippur War, he was a member of the Agranat Commission that investigated the actions that led to the war.

Political career
In 1976 Yadin formed the Democratic Movement for Change, commonly known by its Hebrew acronym Dash, together with Professor Amnon Rubinstein, Shmuel Tamir, Meir Amit, Meir Zorea, and many other prominent public figures. The new party seemed to be an ideal solution for many Israelis who were fed up with alleged corruption in the Labor Alignment (the dominant party in Israel from its founding and up to that time), which included the Yadlin affair, the suicide of Housing Minister Avraham Ofer, and Leah Rabin's illegal dollar-denominated account in the United States. Furthermore, Dash was a response to the increasing sense of frustration and despair in the aftermath of the 1973 war, and the social and political developments that followed in its wake. Many people regarded Yadin, a warrior and a scholar, as the quintessential prototype of the ideal Israeli, untainted by corruption, who could lead the country on a new path.

In the 1977 elections, which transformed the Israeli political landscape, the new party did remarkably well for its first attempt to enter the Knesset, winning 15 of the 120 seats. As a result of the election, Likud party leader Menachem Begin was initially able to form a coalition without Dash (or parties to its left), significantly lowering the bargaining power of Dash. Dash joined the coalition after a few months. As the new Deputy Prime Minister, Yadin played a pivotal role in many events that took place, particularly the contacts with Egypt, which eventually led to the signing of the Camp David Accords and the peace treaty between Israel and its neighbor. Nevertheless, Dash itself proved to be a failure, and the party broke up into numerous splinter factions; Yadin joined the Democratic Movement, but it too split up and he sat as an independent MK for the remainder of his term. During a cabinet meeting, May 1981, while still Deputy Prime Minister, he accused Chief of Staff Rafael Eitan of "lying to the government" and told Prime Minister Begin "You have lost control of the defence establishment."  He retired from politics in 1981.

Yadin was married to Carmela (née Ruppin), who worked with him throughout his career in translating and editing his books and with whom he had two daughters, Orly and Littal.  He died in 1984 and was buried in the military cemetery in Mount Herzl in Jerusalem. The Israeli actor  was his brother.

Published works
 Views of the Biblical World. Jerusalem: International Publishing Company J-m Ltd, 1959.
 The Art of Warfare in Biblical Lands.  McGraw-Hill, 1963.
 Masada: Herod's Fortress and the Zealots’ Last Stand. New York: Random House, 1966.
 Hazor (Schweich Lectures for 1970)
 The Bar Kochba Caves. (Hebrew). Maariv, 1971
 Bar-Kokhba: The Rediscovery of the Legendary Hero of the Second Jewish Revolt against Rome. New York: Random House, 1971
 The Temple Scroll published posthumously London, Weidenfeld & Nicolson, 1985

Yadin published many research papers and ancient text explanations, at the Hebrew University press (in Hebrew):
 The Sons of Light against Sons of Darkness (from the Qumran Caves), 1955
 The Message of the Scrolls, 1957
 The Hidden Scrolls, 1958
 The book of Ben Sira, 1965
 Teffilin of Head from the Qumran caves, 1969
 The Temple Scroll (from the Qumran caves), 1977

See also
 List of Israel's Chiefs of the General Staff
 List of Israel Prize recipients

References

Further reading
 Neil A. Silberman "A Prophet from Amongst You: The Life of Yigael Yadin, Soldier, Scholar, and Mythmaker of Modern Israel" Addison Wesley (1994).

External links
 
 Photographs and film footage of Yadin and his archaeological excavations
 Interviews with the late Professor Yigael Yadin related to his archaeological discoveries

1917 births
1984 deaths
Israeli people of Polish-Jewish descent
Haganah members
Jews in Ottoman Palestine
Leaders of political parties in Israel
Israeli archaeologists
Members of the 9th Knesset (1977–1981)
Members of the Israel Academy of Sciences and Humanities
Israel Prize in Jewish studies recipients
Israel Prize in Jewish studies recipients who were archaeologists
Hebrew University of Jerusalem alumni
People from Jerusalem
Jews in Mandatory Palestine
20th-century Israeli Jews
Democratic Movement for Change politicians
Democratic Movement (Israel) politicians
Government ministers of Israel
Burials at Mount Herzl
Masada
Israeli people of the 1948 Arab–Israeli War
20th-century archaeologists
Corresponding Fellows of the British Academy
Tel Hazor